Félix Abraham Hernández García (born April 8, 1986), nicknamed "King Félix", is a Venezuelan former professional baseball pitcher. He played in Major League Baseball (MLB) for the Seattle Mariners from 2005 through 2019.

On August 15, 2012, Hernández threw the 23rd perfect game in MLB history against the Tampa Bay Rays in a 1–0 victory at Safeco Field. It was also the first perfect game in Seattle Mariners franchise history. His perfect game remains the most recent in Major League Baseball.

On April 23, 2016, Hernández claimed the record for most strikeouts by a Mariners pitcher when he struck out Rafael Ortega of the Los Angeles Angels for his 2,163rd strikeout as a Mariner pitcher.  The previous record of 2,162 strikeouts had been held by Randy Johnson. Hernández's 146th win, which occurred on May 9, gave him the club record in that category as well, surpassing Jamie Moyer.

Early life

Discovery as a prospect
Hernández was born in Valencia, Venezuela. He was first spotted by Luis Fuenmayor, a part-time Mariners scout who saw him pitching at age 14 in a tournament near Maracaibo, Venezuela. Fuenmayor recommended Hernández to fellow scouts Pedro Avila and Emilio Carrasquel, who were impressed with the youngster who could already throw 90 mph. The Seattle Mariners signed Hernandez as soon as he turned 16, in accordance with MLB rules.

After graduating from high school, Hernández finally agreed to his first professional contract. Mariners director of international operations Bob Engle signed Hernández as a nondrafted free agent on July 4, 2002. Hernández received a large signing bonus of $710,000, although he said the Mariners were not the highest bidder. Other teams trying to sign him included the New York Yankees and the Atlanta Braves, with both teams reportedly offering more money than Seattle.

One reason Hernández chose the Mariners is that his idol, fellow Venezuelan pitcher Freddy García, was pitching for the team at the time. His agent, Wil Polidor, also attributed the decision to the influence of Hernández's father Félix Sr., a trucking business owner who handled negotiations for his son. Engle and the other Mariners scouts had cultivated a relationship with the family to explain their plans for Félix and earn the family's trust.

Professional career

Minor league career
The following year, Hernández came to the United States and began pitching in the Mariners' minor league system. In 2003, Hernández tore through Class-A with a 7–2 mark in Everett and Wisconsin. Returning to his native Venezuela to pitch in the winter league there, he held his own at 17 years of age against competition that included established major league players.

Hernández was named the Mariners' minor league pitcher of the year in 2004, a season that also saw him make an appearance in the Futures Game. He started with Inland Empire in the California League, before being promoted to Double-A San Antonio, and finished a combined 14–4 with a 2.95 ERA and 172 strikeouts in 149 innings pitched.

At the beginning of 2005, Baseball America listed him as the No. 1 pitching prospect in baseball and No. 2 overall behind Joe Mauer. Hernández continued his success in 2005 with the Triple-A Tacoma Rainiers in the Pacific Coast League, posting a 9–4 record with a league-leading 2.25 ERA and 100 strikeouts in just 88 innings. He was selected for the Triple-A All-Star Game but did not participate as he spent a month on the disabled list with shoulder bursitis. He was also named the PCL Rookie of the Year and PCL Pitcher of the Year.

Hernández was dubbed "King Felix" by the U.S.S. Mariner fan blog during his minor league years.

Seattle Mariners

Major league debut, 2005
Soon after returning from his injury, Hernández was called up to the major leagues by the Mariners. He made his debut on August 4, 2005, in a 3–1 loss in a road game against the Detroit Tigers. At 19 years, 118 days, he was the youngest pitcher to appear in the major leagues since José Rijo in 1984. Hernández earned his first major league win in his next outing on August 9, 2005, pitching eight shutout innings in a 1–0 victory at home over the Minnesota Twins. Over his first several starts, he registered a streak of 112 batters faced before he allowed his first extra-base hit, a double by Jermaine Dye of the Chicago White Sox.

In 12 starts, Hernández posted a 4–4 record with 77 strikeouts and a 2.67 ERA. With  innings pitched, he exhausted his rookie eligibility. After the season, he became the focus of a disagreement over the possibility of his pitching in the 2006 World Baseball Classic. Although Hernández was placed on a provisional roster by his native Venezuela, the Mariners objected, citing his earlier injury and expressing concern about the stress on his arm from adding this competition to the demands of a full season in the major leagues at such a young age. Their appeal to the WBC technical committee was eventually upheld.

When he arrived in the major leagues, Hernández was given uniform number 59. In 2006, he switched to number 34, the same number Freddy García (since traded to the Chicago White Sox) had worn as a Mariner.

First full season, 2006
For his first full year in the major leagues, Hernández arrived in spring training out of shape and had his preparation for the season interrupted by shin splints. He recovered in time to begin the season in the starting rotation, where he often struggled, but occasionally showed flashes of the potential that had generated such hype. His achievements included a few more personal milestones. He threw his first career complete game on June 11, beating the Los Angeles Angels of Anaheim by a score of 6–2.

On August 27, once more against the Angels, Hernández registered his first shutout, needing only 95 pitches and allowing five hits while picking up four strikeouts. The game, which lasted only 1 hour, 51 minutes, was the shortest in the history of Safeco Field.

Concerned about avoiding possible injury to their young pitcher, the Mariners declared that they would limit the number of innings Hernández pitched to 200 (counting both the regular season and spring training). This required them to skip his turn in the rotation a couple times as the season went on, after the Mariners fell out of contention. To allow him to make one last start at the end of the year, the team decided to raise the limit to 205. His 191 regular-season innings were still the most on the team, and he finished 12–14 with a 4.52 ERA. His 12 victories and 176 strikeouts also led the Mariner pitching staff. He also threw the fastest fastball of all major league starters in 2006, averaging 95.2 miles per hour.

During the offseason, Hernández returned to his parents' home in a modest Valencia neighborhood, while awaiting completion of a house for himself, his girlfriend and daughter. At the team's insistence, he did not pitch in the Venezuelan winter league, unlike his older brother Moises, a pitching prospect trying to crack the majors with the Atlanta Braves. A Seattle Times profile of his life in Venezuela, with its relaxed daily routine, raised eyebrows among those who remained concerned about his conditioning. The team later explained that he had been specifically instructed to rest for two weeks after the season. He then picked up a workout regimen, including an improved diet, daily running, and regular weight training, to lose about 20 pounds. This put Hernández in much better physical condition upon his return to the United States in January, when he began a throwing program in advance of spring training.

2007 season
Based on his improved condition and a successful spring training, the Mariners indicated that in 2007 they would no longer limit the number of innings Hernández could pitch, focusing instead on pitch counts to avoid overuse. Hernández won the honor of being named the team's Opening Day starter. He became the youngest pitcher chosen for this assignment since Dwight Gooden in 1985. He pitched eight innings of a 4–0 victory over the Oakland A's, allowing three hits and two walks while setting a career-high with 12 strikeouts.

Hernández thrust himself into the national spotlight with his next start on April 11 against the Boston Red Sox, a much-hyped duel with Japanese import Daisuke Matsuzaka, who was making his home debut at Fenway Park. Hernández lived up to his end and upstaged the matchup of Matsuzaka pitching to his countryman, Ichiro Suzuki, by hurling no-hit ball for seven innings, finishing with a one-hit, complete-game shutout in a 3–0 victory.

During the first inning of his next start against Minnesota he was removed from the game because of increasing tightness in his right elbow, especially when throwing his slider. After undergoing an MRI exam that night, he was examined the next day and was diagnosed with a strained flexor-pronator muscle in his forearm and was placed on the disabled list. Two planned returns were put off as the team took a cautious approach in bringing him back, although it opted not to send him to the minor leagues for a rehabilitation assignment. Instead, he was activated on May 15 and kept on a reduced pitch count initially.

Upon his return, Hernández initially battled to regain the form he had flashed in those first two starts of the year. Hernández finished the season with a 14–7 record. His victory over the New York Yankees on September 3, in his first appearance at Yankee Stadium, stopped a nine-game Mariner losing streak, but was not enough to keep the team from falling out of playoff contention. His 3.92 ERA for the season was the best among the team's starters, and he again led the Mariners in strikeouts with 165. He again threw the fastest fastball of all major league starters in 2007, averaging 95.6 miles per hour.

2008 season
On June 17, Hernández became the thirteenth AL pitcher ever to throw an "immaculate inning" (striking out the side on exactly nine pitches). He did this versus the Florida Marlins in the 4th inning. On June 23, in his only at bat of the season, Hernández hit his first major league home run, a grand slam, off Johan Santana of the New York Mets. Hernández became the first American League pitcher to hit a grand slam since Cleveland's Steve Dunning hit one on May 11, 1971, and was the first to do so since interleague play and the DH rule began. It was also the first home run ever hit by a Mariners pitcher. Later on in the same game, Carlos Beltrán slid into Hernández as he covered home, injuring the pitcher's left ankle. He was forced to leave the ballgame and was placed on the 15-day disabled list. He finished the season with a perfect 4.000 slugging percentage.

Hernández finished the season with a 9–11 record posting 3.45 ERA and 175 strikeouts. He also threw the fastest fastball of all AL starters in 2008, averaging 94.6 miles per hour.

2009 season
In January, Hernández avoided arbitration and agreed to a one-year, $3.8 million deal. Hernández got off to a fast start, starting the season with a 4–0 record, only to fall cold in May, going 1–3. After a particularly sloppy loss against the Anaheim Angels, manager Don Wakamatsu publicly called him out for not "stepping up" as an ace. Hernández would go on to lose just two games during the rest of the year.

On June 19 against San Diego, Hernández threw a complete game, two-hit shutout against the Padres. This was his first complete game of the season and one of the best starts of his career. His sizzling performance in June (3–0 record, 0.93 ERA, 35 strikeouts) would earn him the AL Pitcher of the Month award for June, and on July 5, 2009, Hernández was selected along with outfielder Ichiro Suzuki as the Mariners representatives in the 2009 MLB All Star Game. He made the first All-Star appearance of his career in the sixth inning, tossing a hitless inning.

By the All-Star break, Hernández was 9–3 with a 2.53 ERA while striking out 122 batters in  innings pitched. At the age of 23 years, he became one of the youngest and fastest pitchers to strikeout 600 batters since Dwight Gooden. He would reach 800 strikeouts by season's end.

During the 2009 season, Hernández set career bests in wins, strikeouts, innings pitched, and earned run average. Hernández finished the season 19–5 with a 2.49 ERA and 217 strikeouts and was in strong contention for the AL Cy Young Award. Hernández ended up finishing second in the award voting behind Zack Greinke.

2010: Cy Young Award season

On January 21, 2010, the Seattle Mariners and Hernández agreed to a 5-year contract extension worth about $78 million, which added to the involved offseason in which the Mariners traded for Cliff Lee and Milton Bradley.
On June 3, 2010, Hernández struck out four batters in one inning. He did so by striking out Joe Mauer on a wild pitch before striking out Justin Morneau. He was the third Mariner to accomplish this feat.

On August 25, 2010, Hernández struck out David Ortiz to record his 1,000th career strikeout. He became the 3rd youngest pitcher to do so since 1952, behind Bert Blyleven and Dwight Gooden, and also the 4th overall, behind Bob Feller.

Hernández faced the Rangers on September 17, 2010, and was working on a no-hitter until Nelson Cruz broke it up with a home run in the eighth inning. In his next start, he threw a complete-game two-hitter in Toronto, surrendering only one run on José Bautista's 50th home run of the year in the first inning. The Mariners offense, however, was shut out by Blue Jays pitching and Hernández was dealt his twelfth loss of the season. Ten of Hernández's twelve losses were in games where the Mariners were shut out or scored only one run, and four other times, the bullpen blew a lead Hernandez turned over to them.

Despite the lackluster win–loss record, Hernández won the 2010 American League Cy Young Award on the strength of all of his other stats, leading the league in ERA, innings pitched, innings per start, quality starts, fewest hits per nine innings, and placing second in strikeouts, walks and hits per nine innings, and complete games, while facing the most batters in the league. Hernández finished the season 13–12 with a 2.27 ERA, 232 strikeouts, and  innings pitched. His 13 wins were the fewest by a starting pitcher to win the Cy Young Award in a non-shortened season (Fernando Valenzuela won the award with 13 wins in a strike-shortened season). He was also named the Sporting News AL Pitcher of the Year, and was nominated for the This Year in Baseball Award. The Baseball Prospectus Internet Baseball Awards named him its AL Cy Young Winner.

2011 season
In 2011 Hernández was selected to the American League All Star Team for the second time. He represented the Mariners alongside rookie starter Michael Pineda and closer Brandon League.

On August 31, 2011, Hernández struck out nine batters, giving him 204 strikeouts to that point in the season. It marked the third straight season in which he reached 200+ strikeouts. The only other pitchers to have three 200-K seasons at 25 or younger over the last 20 years are Clayton Kershaw, Kerry Wood and Yovani Gallardo. Kershaw did it in 2010, 2011, 2012 and 2013. Wood did it in 1998, 2001 and 2002. Gallardo did it in 2009, 2010, and 2011.

2012 season
Hernández was selected for his third All-Star Game on July 1. He did not pitch in the July 3 game after AL Team manager, Ron Washington, stated Hernández's 113 pitches thrown on July 1 was the deciding factor. Hernández pitched his third shutout over his past eight starts when he recorded a 1–0 win over the Yankees on August 4. He gave up two hits and won his sixth decision in a row, the third-longest stretch of his career.

On August 15, Hernández threw the first perfect game in Mariners history and the 23rd and most recent perfect game in MLB history. He recorded 12 strikeouts, five of which were in the last two innings, against the Tampa Bay Rays in a 1–0 victory. It was the fourth no-hitter in team history and Hernández joined Randy Johnson and Chris Bosio as the only Mariners pitchers to throw individual no-hitters. One of the club's no-hitters was combined, needing six pitchers to do so on June 8 against the Dodgers. His perfect game was the last no-hitter thrown in the American League for the next three years, until his Japanese teammate, Hisashi Iwakuma succeeded him on August 12, 2015.

2013 season

On February 13, 2013, Hernández signed a seven-year extension with the Mariners worth $175 million, voiding the final two years of his previous deal and including a team option for 2020. The contract made him the highest-paid pitcher in Major League history, until he was surpassed by the $180 million extension signed by Justin Verlander of the Detroit Tigers in March 2013. On April 22 in a 7–1 win against the Houston Astros, Hernández recorded his 100th career win. In that game Hernández pitched six innings allowed five hits, walked one and struck out nine. On July 6, 2013, Hernández was selected to his fourth All-star game. He pitched in the fourth inning, and let up one hit, but no runs were scored. Hernández had a bad August, going 1–4 with a 5.82 ERA and a .281 OBA. He made only 3 starts in September while trying to rest his oblique. In 31 starts in 2013, Hernández went 12–10 with a 3.04 ERA and 22 quality starts, striking out 216 in  innings. He was 5th in the American League in strikeouts, and 6th in ERA.

On October 19, 2013, Carlos Peguero's wife Maria was charged with three counts of wire fraud after allegedly making $180,000 in online purchases with the debit card belonging to Hernandez's wife. Carlos Peguero told investigators he was unaware of any fraudulent purchases, believing his wife's brother worked for Saks Fifth Avenue, with whom the fraudulent purchases were made. Carlos is not a target of the investigation.

2014 season
Hernández pitched the Mariners season opener on March 31 against the Los Angeles Angels of Anaheim. This marks the seventh time in a row he started the season for Seattle. He got the win going 6 innings, giving up three runs (two earned), and struck out 11 Angels. The Mariners won 10–3. He won his next two starts, both against Oakland. However, Hernández would not win again until May 12. Hernández went 0–1 in that span. 
 
On May 12, Hernández was ejected for the first time in his career against the Tampa Bay Rays at Safeco. When he left the game in the seventh after a three-run double, Hernández started shouting at the home plate umpire in disagreement with his calls. On June 8, Hernández struck out a career-high 15 batters against the Rays in a 5–0 win. Hernández got a no-decision, as all five runs were scored after he left the game. Hernández got his tenth win on June 29, 2014 against the Cleveland Indians in a 3–0 victory in eight shutout innings with just one hit. Fernando Rodney got his 23rd save pitching a perfect ninth to secure the victory.

Hernández was announced as an All-Star along with teammates Robinson Canó, Kyle Seager and Fernando Rodney. On July 14, AL manager John Farrell announced that Hernández would be the starter for the game. Hernández pitched the first inning of the All-Star game, he gave up one infield base hit and struck out two National League batters. Between May 18 and August 11, Hernández pitched 16 straight outings going 7 or more innings and allowing 2 or fewer runs each time. This is the longest such streak in baseball history, surmounting the record previously held of 13 by Tom Seaver set during the 1971 season. This streak was snapped on August 16 against the Detroit Tigers. He gave up two earned runs in five innings. He had to throw 92 pitches.

Hernández won his second American League ERA title with a 2.14 ERA, three points under that of Chicago White Sox pitcher Chris Sale. He achieved the ERA title on the last day of the season, on September 28 against the Angels going 5.1 innings allowing no runs and seven strikeouts. In 2014, Hernández set the lowest ERA mark by an AL pitcher  since Pedro Martínez in 2000. He also set the lowest WHIP by an AL pitcher (0.92) since Martinez in 2000. He finished second in the AL Cy Young Award race behind Cleveland Indians pitcher Corey Kluber. These two faced each other on July 30. Hernández lost 2–0 against him.

2015 season
Hernández was again the opening day starter for the sixth straight time. Despite giving up Mike Trout's first home run of the season (Trout's first 2014 and 2015 at-bats were home runs off of Hernandez), he beat the Angels 4–1 with 7 innings pitched, two hits, one earned run, and struck out 10 Angels. On May 10 against the Oakland Athletics, Hernández recorded his 2,000th strikeout, becoming the fourth-youngest player to reach that milestone. Hernández was selected as an All-Star along with teammate Nelson Cruz by Ned Yost, the 2015 All-Star Game manager. This marks his fifth straight All-Star selection and sixth overall.

The season was not without its struggles for Hernández. Finishing the first two months of the season 8–1 with a 1.91 ERA, Hernández gave up 7 runs to the New York Yankees at home on June 1. On June 12, in a game against the Houston Astros, he gave up eight earned runs while only recording one out, matching the shortest outing of his career and recording a game score of 8, the second-lowest of his career. The outing increased his ERA from 2.51 to 3.38. On August 15, exactly three years to the day he threw a perfect game against the Tampa Bay Rays, he allowed a career-high 10 runs against the Boston Red Sox in only  innings, recording a new career-low game score of −6. His ERA went up from 3.11 to 3.65.

Hernández would finish the season 18–9 with a 3.53 ERA, which was the worst ERA for Hernández ever since the 2008 season. He failed to reach 200 strikeouts for the first time in six years, as he had 201 innings and 191 strikeouts.

2016 season

Hernández started on Opening Day again on April 4. He would lose for the first time ever on Opening Day, pitching six innings, walking five and striking out six. He gave up three runs, one earned. Two starts later at Yankee Stadium, Hernández tied Randy Johnson for most strikeouts as a Mariner, with 2,162, striking out Didi Gregorius looking for the final out of the fifth inning. The next start, Hernández surpassed Randy Johnson's record for most strikeouts by a Mariners' pitcher by striking out Rafael Ortega of the Los Angeles Angels for the second out in the bottom of the first inning. On May 9, Hernández recorded the 146th win of his career against the Tampa Bay Rays, surpassing Jamie Moyer for most wins as a Seattle Mariner. On June 1, Hernández was placed on the 15-day disabled list due to a right calf strain after jumping up to celebrate a home run. On August 15, Hernández earned his 150th career win, defeating Mike Trout and the Angels by a score of 3–2. This milestone win occurred on the fourth anniversary of his perfect game.  

On April 11, 2016, David Schoenfeld of ESPN noted in an on-line article that Felix Hernandez might be the unluckiest pitcher in baseball. "In his time with the M's [though April 11, 2016], Felix failed to get the win in at least 45 games in which he gave up 0 or 1 run, in 317 IP, with a 0.88 ERA and a 0.90 WHIP, with 340K in those 317 IP."  In following seasons through 2019, Hernandez would pitch 5 or more innings in another 7 games in which he gave up 0 or 1 run and did not get a win, with a 1.14 ERA in 47 IP with 45 K's.  For his career, that left him with a total of 52 games in which he gave up either 0 or 1 run and did not get a win. <Felix Hernandez game-by-game pitching logs>

2017 season
On April 25, Hernández was removed from the game after an apparent shoulder injury. The next day, on April 26, further tests revealed that he was diagnosed with right shoulder inflammation, which landed him on the 10-day disabled list. After spending 2 months on the disabled list, he was activated on the weekend of June 24, winning a game against the Houston Astros 13-3 and striking out eight batters. On August 5, Hernández was placed on the disabled list again, due to right biceps tendinitis. It was later revealed that he would miss from three to four weeks due to right shoulder bursitis.

2018 season
On February 26, Hernández was removed from a Spring Training game against the Chicago Cubs. He was struck on his throwing arm after a comeback hit from Cubs catcher Victor Caratini. Manager Scott Servais removed Hernández from the game, and he was later diagnosed with a contusion on his right forearm. He was listed as out for at least 10 days, though two weeks was the expected timetable for return. 

On March 29, 2018, Hernández made his tenth Opening Day start in a row. Only Jack Morris, Robin Roberts and Tom Seaver have made more consecutive Opening Day starts. He pitched 5.1 innings, giving up no earned runs on two hits, two walks, and four strikeouts. The Mariners won the game 2–1. On July 10, he was placed on the disabled list for the third straight season.

On August 7, 2018, Hernández allowed 11 runs in six innings, in a loss to the Texas Rangers. This raised his ERA to a career-worst 5.73 in 23 starts. After the game, manager Scott Servais would not commit to his next start in the rotation. On August 9, Servais removed Hernández from the starting lineup. On August 10, Hernández was removed from the starting rotation and transitioned to the bullpen. He made his first appearance as a reliever on August 14 against the A's when starting pitcher James Paxton was struck by a line drive. Hernández temporarily returned to the rotation with Paxton on the disabled list. Hernández finished the worst season of his career, going 8–14 with an ERA of 5.55 in  innings.

2019 season
On March 9, manager Scott Servais announced that Marco Gonzales would be the Opening Day starter in Tokyo, Japan, ending Hernández's streak of 10 consecutive Opening Day starts, a feat which had been accomplished by only 6 other pitchers in history. Hernández began the 2019 season against the Los Angeles Angels as the Mariners' number 5 starter in the rotation, pitching 5.1 innings allowing 3 runs (only 1 earned) on 7 hits and 4 strikeouts.

On May 11 against the Boston Red Sox, Hernández recorded his 2,500th strikeout by striking out Michael Chavis, becoming the sixth-youngest pitcher in Major League history to reach the 2,500 strikeout mark. However, he was placed on the 10-day injured list after the start with a right shoulder strain. In June, he went on a rehabilitation assignment with the Triple-A Tacoma Rainiers.
On September 26, 2019, Hernández pitched in his final game of the season in a 3–1 loss to the Oakland Athletics. In the game, he threw for  innings, gave up 5 hits, 3 runs and walked 4 batters while striking out 3. Hernández ended the 2019 season with a 1–8 record, 57 strikeouts, and an ERA of 6.40 in  innings. On October 31, Hernández became a free agent.

"King's Court"
On May 28, 2011, a special cheering section for Hernández, dubbed "King's Court", debuted in Safeco Field on the foul territory side of the left field foul pole. The creation of the Mariners marketing director, it marked the first time in Major League Baseball that a stadium promotion was designed around a popular player. By popular demand, the cheering section was expanded from two to three sections – Sections 148, 149, and 150 – by the end of the year. Seats are sold at a discount and the ticket price includes a yellow "King Félix" T-shirt and a yellow placard imprinted with a large "K" to wave when cheering for strikeouts by Hernández. "King's Court" is typically occupied by about 1,500 fans on days that Hernández starts. Hernández reportedly liked the cheering squad, but was able to maintain his concentration and not give in to the temptation to throw a fastball on an 0–2 count in response to his cheering fans. Whenever there was a marquee matchup (duel of team aces), or a big/important game in which Hernández pitched, another King's Court was added in the upper deck directly above the King's Court. These sections were called the "High Court".

Atlanta Braves
On January 20, 2020, Hernández signed a minor league deal with the Atlanta Braves for $1 million. On July 4, 2020, Hernández announced he would be opting out of the 2020 season due to concerns related to the COVID-19 pandemic. He became a free agent on November 2, 2020.

Baltimore Orioles
On February 3, 2021, Hernández signed a minor league contract with the Baltimore Orioles organization. On March 29, Hernandez opted out of his contract with the Orioles and became a free agent.

International career
Hernández represented his native Venezuela in the 2009 World Baseball Classic. In his first outing, he pitched four innings in relief, surrendering only one hit while not allowing a run. In his next game, Hernández shut out Puerto Rico over  innings. Hernandez participated in the 2017 World Baseball Classic, playing for Venezuela.

Pitching style
Hernández has been known to throw a sinker (two-seam fastball), a slider (he avoided the slider early in his career because the team was concerned it might injure his arm), a changeup, and a curveball. His fastball no longer reaches the 100 mph as it did when he first broke into MLB, but he has become a much craftier and more efficient pitcher over the years. In 2016, Hernández's sinker averaged about 90–92 mph; four-seam fastball at 90–92 mph; slider at 84–86 mph; curveball at 79–81 mph; changeup at 87-88 mph; and the occasional cut fastball at 88–90 mph. The changeup was his most commonly used two-strike pitch, and had the highest whiff rate of his pitches. 

When at his best, Hernández can induce a steady procession of groundball outs and strikeouts, with very few balls being hit in the air. For example, in his perfect game, Hernández only allowed 5 batted balls to even leave the infield, and after the 3rd inning, no balls left the infield with the exception of one Ben Zobrist flyout. Meanwhile, he forced 8 groundouts and 12 strikeouts.

Like some other pitchers, Hernández wears a long-sleeved undershirt beneath his uniform jersey. While typically this is done to keep the pitcher's arm from getting chilled, Hernández wears it even in the hottest weather. For him it serves to keep perspiration from running down his arms and interfering with his hand's grip on the baseball.

Personal life
Hernández and his wife have a son and daughter and the family resides in Clyde Hill, Washington. His family and relatives call him by his middle name, Abraham. Hernandez's older brother, Moises spent 12 seasons playing minor league baseball in various organizations.

Hernández has two dogs, King and Oreo, and he is a spokesman for the Seattle King County Humane Society. Hernández is also the Seattle Mariners Ambassador for the Pepsi Refresh Project, raising money for the Washington State Coalition Against Domestic Violence.

In September 2018 Hernández became naturalized as a United States citizen.

See also

 List of Major League Baseball career strikeout leaders
 List of Major League Baseball no-hitters
 List of Major League Baseball perfect games
 List of Major League Baseball players from Venezuela
 List of Major League Baseball single-inning strikeout leaders
 List of Seattle Mariners no-hitters
 List of Seattle Mariners team records
 Seattle Mariners award winners and league leaders

References

External links

1986 births
Living people
American League All-Stars
American League ERA champions
American League wins champions
Cardenales de Lara players
Cy Young Award winners
Everett AquaSox players
Inland Empire 66ers of San Bernardino players
Luis Aparicio Award winners
Major League Baseball pitchers
Major League Baseball players from Venezuela
Modesto Nuts players
Venezuelan expatriate baseball players in the United States
Major League Baseball pitchers who have pitched a perfect game
Navegantes del Magallanes players
San Antonio Missions players
Seattle Mariners players
Sportspeople from Valencia, Venezuela
Tacoma Rainiers players
Venezuelan emigrants to the United States
Wisconsin Timber Rattlers players
World Baseball Classic players of Venezuela
2009 World Baseball Classic players
2017 World Baseball Classic players
Naturalized citizens of the United States